The Manfred Wörner Foundation is a Bulgarian not-for-profit non-governmental organization established on 20 October 1994, and registered in 1996. It is named in honour of Manfred Wörner, former secretary-general of NATO.

Mission
Its mission is to foster and project Atlantic values, solidarity and cooperation, help advance the European peace and security policies in a strategic partnership with America, promote personal liberties and economic freedom, support the sustainable economic, social and demographic development of Bulgaria, contribute to the exploration and conservation of the national and world natural heritage, and uphold the European vision of Manfred Wörner (1934–1994).

Activities

The foundation sponsored the naming of Manfred Wörner Street in Sofia in 1995, the naming of Wörner Gap on Livingston Island, Antarctica, in 1996, and the erection of a Manfred Wörner Monument in South Park, Sofia, in 1996.

The foundation is focusing its activities on training and education, technical assistance to state and local authorities, transboundary regional development, promotion of new immigration policies for Bulgaria, and Antarctic research including the organization and management of the scientific Antarctic expedition Tangra 2004/05 and the establishment of Camp Academia on Livingston Island in the South Shetland Islands, and published Antarctic topographic maps, donating free copies to all Bulgarian schools.

The foundation has established an Atlantic Solidarity Award, given by a jury comprising representatives of the Bulgarian civil society in appreciation of outstanding personal contributions to world peace and liberty. Lord George Robertson became the first recipient of the award in 2003.

The founding president (since 1994) is Lyubomir Ivanov. Elfie Wörner was the honorary director of the foundation in 1997–2006.

Publications 
 Rights and Integration of Immigrants in Bulgaria. Sofia: Manfred Wörner Foundation, 2003. 12 pp. (in Bulgarian, Arabic, Russian and English)
 Towards New Immigration Policies for Bulgaria, a collection of papers. Sofia: Manfred Wörner Foundation, 2006. (in Bulgarian, English summary) 
 The Future of the Falkland Islands and Its People. Sofia: Manfred Wörner Foundation, 2003. Printed in Bulgaria by Double T Publishers. 96 pp. 
 Immigrants and Refugees in Bulgaria and Their Integration: Guidelines for New Immigration Policies, a collection of papers. Sofia: NI Plus Publishing House, 2003. 
 Bulgarian Policies on the Republic of Macedonia: Recommendations on the development of good neighbourly relations following Bulgaria’s accession to the EU and in the context of NATO and EU enlargement in the Western Balkans. Sofia: Manfred Wörner Foundation, 2008. 80 pp. (Trilingual publication in Bulgarian, Macedonian and English) 
 Immigration and Integration: European Experiences. Sofia: Manfred Wörner Foundation, 2008. 
 Antarctica: Livingston Island and Greenwich, Robert, Snow and Smith Islands. Scale 1:120000 topographic map. Troyan: Manfred Wörner Foundation, 2009. (in Bulgarian) 
 Antarctica: Livingston Island and Greenwich, Robert, Snow and Smith Islands. Scale 1:120000 topographic map. Troyan: Manfred Wörner Foundation, 2009. 
 Bulgaria in Antarctica. South Shetland Islands. Sofia: Manfred Wörner Foundation, 2009. 16 pp., with a folded map. 
 Antarctic: Nature, History, Utilization, Geographic Names and Bulgarian Participation. Sofia: Manfred Wörner Foundation, 2014. 368 pp. (in Bulgarian)  (Second revised and updated edition, 2014. 411 pp. )
 Bulgarian Names in Antarctica. Sofia: Manfred Wörner Foundation, 2019. 526 pp. (in Bulgarian)  (Second revised and updated edition, 2021. 539 pp. )
 Bowles Ridge and Central Tangra Mountains: Livingston Island, Antarctica. Scale 1:25000 map. Sofia, 2023.

References 

Manfred Wörner Foundation
 Dr. Manfred Wörner Circle: Institutes and Organisations
 The problem Chechnya or the problem Putin? Kultura Weekly, 1 October 2004. (in Bulgarian)
 Scientific conference on the immigration policies and practices before Bulgaria’s accession to EU. National Council for Cooperation on Ethnic and Demographic Issues. October 2006. (in Bulgarian)
 Bulgarians of future time. Capital Weekly, 27 September 2006. (in Bulgarian)
 Bulgaria Country Report 2007. International Center for Minority Studies and Intercultural Relations. July 2007.
 Bulgaria, Macedonia: Blog Wars Over History. Ground Report, 10 April 2008.
 Do they mean us? The Frontier Times: Bulgaria's English Language Newspaper, 30 October 2008.
 New Bulgarian topographic map of the South Shetlands Islands, Antarctica. Bulgarian Academy of Sciences: News in Science. 4 June 2009.
 Presentation of a new Bulgarian topographic map of the South Shetlands Islands, Antarctica. Econ.bg, 12 June 2009.

External links

1994 establishments in Bulgaria
Think tanks established in 1994
Think tanks based in Bulgaria
Foreign policy and strategy think tanks
Organizations related to NATO
Political and economic think tanks based in Europe
Political and economic research foundations